Christianson syndrome is an X linked syndrome associated with intellectual disability, microcephaly, seizures, ataxia and absent speech.

Presentation

Onset of symptoms is normally within the first year of life with truncal ataxia and seizures. The head is small (microcephaly). Common facial abnormalities include: 
 Long narrow face
 Prominent nose
 Prominent jaw
 Large ears
 Open mouth
 Thick eyebrows

Other common features include:
 Uncontrolled drooling
 Abnormal eye movements

The associated intellectual disability is usually in the profound range.

Those affected often have a happy demeanor with frequent smiling and spontaneous laughter.

Genetics

This condition is caused by mutations in the SLC9A6 gene. This gene is located on the long arm of the X chromosome (Xq26.3). The gene encodes a sodium/hydrogen exchanger located in the endosomes. Mutations in this gene cause a rise in the pH of the endosomes.

How this causes the clinical features is not known presently. The inheritance of this condition is X-linked dominant.

Diagnosis

The diagnosis may be suspected on clinical grounds. It is made by sequencing the SLC9A6 gene.

Differential diagnosis
 Angelman syndrome
 Spinocerebellar ataxia type 29

Management

There is presently no curative treatment. Management is supportive.

Epidemiology

The prevalence is not known but this is considered to be a rare disease.

History

This condition was first described in 1999. The causative mutation was discovered in 2008.

References

Rare syndromes